The 2021–22 Penn State Lady Lions basketball team represented Pennsylvania State University during the 2021–22 NCAA Division I women's basketball season. The Lady Lions were led by third-year head coach Carolyn Kieger and played their home games at the Bryce Jordan Center as members of the Big Ten Conference.

They finished the season 11–18 and 5–13 in Big Ten play to finish in a tie for eleventh place.  As the twelfth seed in the Big Ten tournament, they were defeated by Rutgers in the First Round.  They were not invited to the NCAA tournament or the WNIT.

Previous season
The Lady Lions finished the season 9–15 and 6–12 in Big Ten play to finish in eleventh place.  As the tenth seed in the Big Ten tournament, they were defeated by Michigan State in the Second Round.  They were not invited to the NCAA tournament or the WNIT.

Roster

Schedule and results

Source:

|-
!colspan=6 style=| Regular season

|-
!colspan=6 style=| Big Ten Women's Tournament

Rankings

The Coaches Poll did not release a Week 2 poll and the AP Poll did not release a poll after the NCAA Tournament.

References

Penn State Lady Lions basketball seasons
Penn State
Penn State
Penn State